Regner is a white German wine grape variety that is a crossing of the table grape Seidentraube (also known as Luglienga bianca) and the Vitis vinifera red grape variety Gamay. The variety was developed in 1929 and by 2019 there was almost  of Regner planted in Germany, all in the Rheinhessen. By the late 20th century, wine growers in England were also experimenting with the variety.

People with the firstname/surname 
 Regner Leuhusen (1900–1994), Swedish Army lieutenant general
 Evelyn Regner (born 1966), Austrian politician

Viticulture
Regner is an early budding and ripening vine that can accumulate high must weights but low acidity levels if harvested very late in the season.

See also
 Regner (surname)

References

White wine grape varieties